Rostokino Aqueduct, also known as Millionny Bridge, is a stone aqueduct over Yauza River in Rostokino District of Moscow, Russia, built in 1780-1804. It is the only remaining aqueduct in Moscow, once a part of Mytishchi Water Supply, Moscow's first centralized water utility.

History
The aqueduct was commissioned by Catherine II of Russia to engineer Friedrich Wilhelm Bauer. Catherine authorized 1.1 million rouble expenditure and 400 soldiers. Builders used second-hand stone left by demolition of Bely Gorod fortifications. Construction, frequently interrupted, dragged for 25 years, as the soldier engineers were summoned to the  war with Turkey (1787-1792) and various other jobs. In the process, both Catherine and Bauer died. Colonel Ivan Gerard lead the project after Bauer's death in 1783. Catherine's son, Paul I, had to issue 400,000 roubles financing; Alexander I added 200,000 roubles. Finally, the aqueduct was completed at an unprecedented cost of 2 million roubles, thus the name Millionny Bridge.

Specifications
There are 21 arches, each spans .

Water flowed naturally through a 20-kilometre masonry canal to a system of fountain taps; in 1892, the system was uprated with construction of pumps and water reservoires in the city. Mytishchi Water Supply was closed in 1937, when a superior water supply, a part of Moscow Canal project, was completed.

Ichka Aqueduct (demolished)
A smaller, single-span aqueduct over Ichka river was built during the 1888-1892 modernization of Mytishchi system. It was destroyed in 1997 to make way for MKAD highway.

See also

List of bridges in Moscow

References

Aqueducts in Russia
Bridges in Moscow
Bridges completed in 1804
Stone arch bridges
Cultural heritage monuments of federal significance in Moscow